John Darell (died 1438) was an English politician.

Life
Darell was of Calehill in Little Chart, Scotney Castle in Lamberhurst, Kent. He was the second son of William Darell. The Darell family were from Sessay, Yorkshire. In 1400, he married Thomasina Barey of Faversham, who would only have been around twelve years old at this time. His second wife was Joan Chichele, a widow.

Career
Darell was a Member of Parliament for Kent in 1407, May 1413, April 1414, 1417, 1425, 1427
and 1429, and Sheriff of Kent three times (1411, 1417 and 1422).

References

Year of birth missing
1438 deaths
14th-century births
English MPs 1407
High Sheriffs of Kent
English MPs May 1413
English MPs April 1414
English MPs 1417
English MPs 1425
English MPs 1427
English MPs 1429
People from Little Chart
People from Lamberhurst